The swamp flycatcher or swamp alseonax (Muscicapa aquatica) is a species of bird in the family Muscicapidae.
It is found in Benin, Burkina Faso, Burundi, Cameroon, Central African Republic, Chad, Democratic Republic of the Congo, Ivory Coast, Gambia, Ghana, Guinea-Bissau, Kenya, Mali, Niger, Nigeria, Rwanda, Senegal, South Sudan, Tanzania, Togo, Uganda, and Zambia.
Its natural habitats are subtropical or tropical moist shrubland and swamps.

References

swamp flycatcher
Birds of Sub-Saharan Africa
swamp flycatcher
Taxa named by Theodor von Heuglin
Taxonomy articles created by Polbot